John Hooker may refer to:

John Hooker (English constitutionalist) (c. 1527–1601), English writer, solicitor, antiquary, civic administrator and advocate of republican government
John Lee Hooker (1912–2001), American blues singer-songwriter and guitarist
John Lee Hooker Jr. (born 1952), American blues musician
John Daggett Hooker (1838–1911), social leader, amateur scientist and astronomer, donor of the Hooker Telescope
John Hooker (abolitionist) (1816–1901), lawyer, judge, abolitionist, and reformer for women's rights
John Hooker (novelist) (1932–2008), Australian novelist
John Jay Hooker (1930–2016), American attorney, entrepreneur, political gadfly and perennial candidate
John Michael Hooker (1953–2003), American murderer executed in Oklahoma